Facundo Sava (born 7 March 1974) is a former Argentine footballer and current manager of Paraguayan Primera División club Cerro Porteño.

Sava played 17 years of professional football, mainly representing Gimnasia and Racing Club in the Argentine Primera División. Abroad, he had brief spells at Fulham in the Premier League, and Celta Vigo and Lorca Deportiva in Spain's Segunda División in the early 2000s.

In 2012, Sava began managing, leading several clubs in his country's top flight including Racing and Gimnasia, as well as O'Higgins in the Chilean Primera División. He won the Copa Argentina with Patronato in 2022.

Playing career

Early years and Fulham
Sava started his career at Ferro Carril Oeste in 1993. In 1996, he moved to Boca Juniors. A year later, he was sold on to Gimnasia y Esgrima La Plata. In 2002, Sava was sold to Fulham on a four-year deal for £2 million, having helped his team come second to Club Atlético River Plate. He was the one signing made by Franco Baresi as sporting director, while manager Jean Tigana was on holiday.

Sava made his debut on 6 July in the UEFA Intertoto Cup first round away to FC Haka in Finland, playing 60 minutes before being substituted for Barry Hayles. His Premier League debut was on 17 August as the season began with a 4–1 home win over Bolton Wanderers; he came on for Louis Saha with 12 minutes remaining. In the next game a week later, again from the bench, he equalised in the last minute in a 2–2 draw at Middlesbrough. 

On 23 November 2002, Sava scored once in each half of a 3–2 win over Liverpool at Craven Cottage. Three days later, he failed to clear for the first goal and scored an own goal for the second, as Fulham lost 2–1 to Hertha BSC in the fourth round of the UEFA Cup; he was openly criticised by Tigana for his performance. During his time at Fulham, Sava celebrated goals by putting on a mask that he pulled from his sock; he explained that it came from his time at Gimnasia when fans threw masks onto the pitch.

Affected by injury, Sava played only six games in 2003–04, scoring once for Chris Coleman's team.

Spain
On 27 August 2004, Sava was loaned to RC Celta de Vigo, newly relegated to the Spanish Segunda División and who had lost star striker Savo Milošević. He made his debut on 4 September as a substitute in a 1–0 home win over Gimnàstic de Tarragona. Twenty-two days later, he played the full match and scored his first goal in his fifth game, to open a 1–1 draw at Real Murcia; he contributed three goals in 26 games, mainly as a substitute, as the team returned to La Liga as runners-up to Cádiz CF.

In 2005–06, Sava signed on loan for another team in Spain's second division, Unai Emery's Lorca Deportiva. He contributed seven goals in 38 games to help towards a fifth-place finish; this included two on 20 November in a 4–0 home win over Hércules CF.

Return to Argentina
Sava was one of six Fulham players released in May 2006. He then returned to his country's top flight, at Racing Club de Avellaneda.

In 2008, he joined Arsenal de Sarandí and, the following season, he helped Quilmes Atlético Club achieve promotion to the Argentine Primera División. However, he did not stay with Quilmes in the Primera, instead returning to his first club, Ferro Carril Oeste, after 14 years. With Ferro, he played 6 games in the 2010–11 season of the Primera B Nacional, before deciding to retire. He played his last game in an away draw against Club Atlético Belgrano on 11 September 2010.

Coaching career
On 23 April 2012, Sava took his first coaching job as the head coach at San Martín de San Juan, having previously been the assistant. He made his debut five days later, in a 1–0 home top-flight win over Godoy Cruz Antonio Tomba. On 4 September, having lost all five games of the new season, he was sacked.

At the start of 2013, Sava succeeded Nery Pumpido at Unión de Santa Fe. He kept his job after relegation, but was dismissed in December as the team fell out of the Nacional B play-off positions.

In May 2014, Sava was appointed by Chilean Primera División club O'Higgins F.C. as the replacement for his compatriot, Eduardo Berizzo. The following January, he was dismissed after a defeat at C.D. Universidad de Concepción.

Sava was hired by his former team Quilmes in July 2015, moving in December to replace Diego Cocca at Racing Club for a 3 million Argentine peso fee. He made his debut on 4 February 2016 in his first continental game, a 2–2 draw at Puebla FC in Mexico for the Copa Libertadores qualifying round, eventually being eliminated 2–1 in the last 16 in May by Brazil's Clube Atlético Mineiro. Club president Víctor Blanco confirmed Sava as manager for the rest of the calendar year, but he left and was replaced by Ricardo Zielinski before the new season.

In March 2017, Sava was hired for two years at Club Atlético Tigre. On 3 June, he announced his resignation following a 3–0 home loss to Club Atlético Vélez Sarsfield. At the start of the new year, he returned to Gimnasia where he had left as a player 16 years earlier. He left on 21 April, after achieving two wins and three draws from 12 games.

Sava returned to Quilmes in December 2019. In 2021, the team reached the promotion play-off final, losing on penalties to Barracas Central after a goalless draw on 21 December.

In March 2022, Sava returned to the top flight, being hired by Club Atlético Patronato for the rest of the year. He guided the team to the Copa Argentina, winning 2–1 at Gimnasia in the last 16, on penalties against River Plate in the quarter-finals, and on the same method against Boca Juniors in the semi-finals, before defeating Talleres de Córdoba by a single goal in the final on 31 October. Days later, he announced that he would not renew his contract.

Honours
Fulham
UEFA Intertoto Cup: 2002

Patronato
Copa Argentina: 2022

References

External links
 Argentine Primera statistics at Fútbol XXI  
 Guardian statistics
 
 

1974 births
Living people
Sportspeople from Buenos Aires Province
Argentine footballers
Argentine expatriate footballers
Argentine football managers
Association football forwards
Ferro Carril Oeste footballers
Club de Gimnasia y Esgrima La Plata footballers
Boca Juniors footballers
Arsenal de Sarandí footballers
Racing Club de Avellaneda footballers
Quilmes Atlético Club footballers
Fulham F.C. players
RC Celta de Vigo players
Lorca Deportiva CF footballers
Argentine Primera División players
Premier League players
Segunda División players
Argentine expatriate sportspeople in England
Argentine expatriate sportspeople in Spain
Argentine expatriate sportspeople in Chile
Expatriate footballers in England
Expatriate footballers in Spain
Expatriate football managers in Chile
San Martín de San Juan managers
Unión de Santa Fe managers
O'Higgins F.C. managers
Racing Club de Avellaneda managers
Club Atlético Tigre managers
Club de Gimnasia y Esgrima La Plata managers
Quilmes Atlético Club managers
Club Atlético Patronato managers
Argentine Primera División managers
Chilean Primera División managers
Cerro Porteño managers
Argentine expatriate sportspeople in Paraguay
Expatriate football managers in Paraguay